The Star Awards for Favourite Male Character was an award presented annually at the Star Awards, a ceremony that was established in 1994.

The category was introduced in 2010, at the 16th Star Awards ceremony; Nat Ho received the award for his role in The Dream Catchers and it is given in honour of an actor (not necessary to be contracted under Mediacorp) who portrayed a drama series or variety character that is deemed the most popular among the television audience. Prior to 2012, the nominees were determined by a team of judges employed by Mediacorp. The rule was removed in 2012 to allow the public to determine the nominees entirely via online voting. Winners are also selected by a majority vote from the public via online voting as well.

Since its inception, the award was given to four actors. Xu Bin is the most recent winner in this category for his role in My Star Bride. Elvin Ng is the only actor to win in this category thrice, surpassing Xu who has two wins. In addition, Ng has been nominated on five occasions, more than any other actor. Aloysius Pang and Romeo Tan hold the record for the most nominations without a win, with four.

The award was discontinued from 2017, along with the Favourite Female Character and Favourite Onscreen Couple (Drama) awards.

In 2022, the award was revived but came under a new name called Favourite Male Show Stealer. Also, Favourite Onscreen Couple (Drama) came with a new name Favourite Couple and Favourite Female Character came with a new name Favourite Female Show Stealer.

Recipients

 Each year is linked to the article about the Star Awards held that year.

Category facts

Most wins

Most nominations

References

External links 

Star Awards